The 2001–02 NBA season was the Jazz's 28th season in the National Basketball Association, and 23rd season in Salt Lake City, Utah. During the off-season, the Jazz signed free agent John Amaechi. Russian basketball star Andrei Kirilenko, who was drafted by the Jazz in the 1999 NBA draft, would finally make his debut in the NBA. John Stockton continued to set new standards with 15,000 career assists and 3,000 career steals, as Karl Malone scored his 34,000th career point. However, the Jazz began to show their age as they struggled losing five of their first seven games, leading to a 6–11 start to the season. They played above .500 for the remainder of the season, holding a 25–24 record at the All-Star break, finishing fourth in the Midwest Division, and eighth in the Western Conference with a 44–38 record. The Jazz also beat the Los Angeles Lakers' record of sixteen consecutive winning seasons above .500, set between the 1976–77 and 1991–92 seasons.

Malone averaged 22.4 points and 8.6 rebounds per game, and was selected for the 2002 NBA All-Star Game, but did not play due to visiting his sick mother back home in Louisiana. In addition, Donyell Marshall averaged 14.8 points and 7.6 rebounds per game, while Stockton provided the team with 13.4 points, 8.2 assists and 1.9 steals per game, Bryon Russell contributed 9.6 points per game, and Kirilenko averaged 10.7 points, 4.9 rebounds and 1.9 blocks per game, and was selected to the NBA All-Rookie First Team.

However, in the Western Conference First Round of the playoffs, the Jazz lost in four games to the Sacramento Kings. Following the season, Russell signed as a free agent with the Washington Wizards after nine seasons in Utah, while Marshall signed with the Chicago Bulls, and John Starks and John Crotty both retired.

Draft picks

Roster

Regular season

Season standings

Record vs. opponents

Game log

Playoffs

|- align="center" bgcolor="#ffcccc"
| 1
| April 20
| @ Sacramento
| L 86–89
| Karl Malone (25)
| Donyell Marshall (10)
| John Stockton (12)
| ARCO Arena17,317
| 0–1
|- align="center" bgcolor="#ccffcc"
| 2
| April 23
| @ Sacramento
| W 93–86
| Donyell Marshall (19)
| Karl Malone (12)
| John Stockton (12)
| ARCO Arena17,317
| 1–1
|- align="center" bgcolor="#ffcccc"
| 3
| April 27
| Sacramento
| L 87–90
| Karl Malone (23)
| Malone, Russell (6)
| Malone, Stockton (7)
| Delta Center19,911
| 1–2
|- align="center" bgcolor="#ffcccc"
| 4
| April 29
| Sacramento
| L 86–91
| Karl Malone (14)
| Greg Ostertag (15)
| John Stockton (9)
| Delta Center19,911
| 1–3
|-

Player statistics

NOTE: Please write the players statistics in alphabetical order by last name.

Season

Playoffs

Awards and records
 Andrei Kirilenko, NBA All-Rookie Team 1st Team

Transactions

References

Utah Jazz seasons
Utah
Utah
Utah